Tutti Frutti is a Brazilian rock band formed in the early 1970s by musicians living in the Pompeia neighbourhood, in São Paulo. Between 1973 and 1978, with leading guitarist Luís Sérgio Carlini, the band accompanied Rita Lee in her shows after she had left Os Mutantes. This proved to be a successful association, making Tutti Frutti one of the most prominent Brazilian rock groups in the 1970s. They recorded with Rita Lee several national hits as "Agora só Falta Você", "Esse Tal de Roque Enrow", "Ovelha Negra", "Corista de Rock", "Miss Brasil 2000" and "Jardins da Babilônia". After the association with her came to an end in 1978, the band continued to perform with lead singer Simbas until they finally broke up in 1981. Carlini, who owns the Tutti Frutti brand name, has attempted various other formations since then, achieving only limited success.

In 1981, various ex-members of the band joined together to form a new rock group named Rádio Táxi, that went on to release a string of hit singles in the early/mid 80s.

Formation

Current members
 Franklin Paolillo: drums
 Gilberto Nardo: vocals
 Johnny Boy: keyboards
 Luís Sérgio Carlini: guitars and vocals
 Mr. Ruffino: bass
 Roy Carlini: guitars
 Rubens Nardo: vocals
 Sol Ribeiro: vocals

Past members
 Emilson Colantonio
 Guilherme Bueno
 Juba Gurgel
 Lee Marcucci
 Lúcia Turnbull
 Marcos Posato
 Marinho Thomaz
 Naila Mello
 Paulo Maurício
 Renato Figueiredo
 Roberto de Carvalho (Rita Lee's husband)
 Ronaldo Paschoa
 Sérgio Della Monica
 Simbas
 Walter Bailot
 Willie de Oliveira

Discography

Rita Lee & Tutti Frutti

 1974 - Atrás do Porto Tem uma Cidade - Philips
 1975 - Fruto Proibido - Som Livre
 1975 - Hollywood Rock (compilation) - Polydor
 1976 - Entradas e Bandeiras - Som Livre
 1976 - "Cavaleiros negros"/"Tudo bem"/"Balada do amigo" (single) - Som Livre
 1976 - O melhor de Rita Lee (compilation) - Phonogram
 1977 - Refestança (live, with Gilberto Gil)
 1978 - Babilônia

Tutti Frutti

 1977 - Tutti Frutti - Capitol Records
 1979 - Você (single) - EMI-Odeon
 1980 - Você Sabe Qual o Melhor Remédio - RCA Victor
 1980 - Tibet (guest participation)

References

External links 
 Senhor Magazine: Tutti Frutti, do bairro Pompeia à lenda do rock nacional nos anos setenta
 Cravo Albin Dictionary of Brazilian Music: Tutti Frutti
 O Globo: Disco raro mostra transição entre carreira solo de Rita Lee e os tempos de Mutantes da roqueira

Brazilian rock music groups
Musical groups established in 1971
1971 establishments in Brazil
Musical groups disestablished in 1981
Musical groups from São Paulo
Musical groups reestablished in 1997
Musical groups disestablished in 2007
1981 disestablishments in Brazil
1997 establishments in Brazil
2007 disestablishments in Brazil